The Murrumbeena Football Club is an Australian rules football club located in the southern suburbs of Melbourne. The club participates in the Southern Football Netball League, based in the south and south eastern suburbs of Melbourne, Victoria. Murrumbeen plays on the historic Peter Robertson Oval, their home ground located along Kangaroo Rd, Murrumbeena.

History
The club was established in 1918. Founded as a junior club that only allowed players under 21 years of age, the club later dropped its age restrictions when the club joined the Sub-District Football League in 1928. In 1934 it moved to the Caulfield-Oakleigh-Dandenong Football League and promptly won the premiership against South Oakleigh.

Murrumbeena was often the bridesmaid as they regularly made the grand final but were unable to win it. The creation of a new league, the South East Suburban Football League saw the breakthrough when they won the premiership. A regular finals competitor the club won another flag in 1974.

By the mid 1980s the cost of paying players put a strain on the finances. Players left for greener pastures and the club slid down to Third Division.  The club won a Third Division flag in 1986 and later again in the Southern League in 1993.

Senior premierships
 Caulfield Oakleigh Dandenong Football League (1): 1934
 South East Suburban Football League (3): 1963, 1974, 1986
 Southern Football League
 Division 2 (1): 2003
 Division 3 (1): 1993

References

External links
 Official website

Australian rules football clubs in Melbourne
Southern Football League (Victoria)
1918 establishments in Australia
Australian rules football clubs established in 1918
Sport in the City of Glen Eira